Melike İpek Yalova (born 29 April 1984) is a Turkish actress. She is also the daughter of the former minister of state Yüksel Yalova.

After studying international communications at Bilkent University, Yalova studied international politics and crisis management at the Sapienza University of Rome. She made her debut as an actress in 2011, with a recurring role in the Turkish historical drama Muhteşem Yüzyıl, in which she portrayed a Castilian princess named Isabella. Between 2012–2015, she had a leading role in the drama series Karadayı. She then had brief roles in the series Hayat Şarkısı, Çember and İnsanlık Suçu. The next year she was cast in a leading role in series Bir Zamanlar Çukurova.

Filmography

References

External links 
 
 

1984 births
Actresses from Istanbul
Living people
Turkish Muslims
Turkish television actresses
Turkish film actresses